Kim Han-soo (Hangul: 김한수, Hanja: 金翰秀; born October 30, 1971 in Seoul, South Korea) was a South Korean baseball player and a manager of Samsung Lions. He was a member of the South Korean national baseball team which won the bronze medal in the baseball tournament of the 2000 Summer Olympics.

External links 
 
 
 Career statistics and player information from Korea Baseball Organization

1971 births
Asian Games medalists in baseball
Baseball players at the 2000 Summer Olympics
Baseball players at the 2002 Asian Games
Chung-Ang University alumni
KBO League third basemen
Living people
Medalists at the 2000 Summer Olympics
Olympic bronze medalists for South Korea
Olympic baseball players of South Korea
Olympic medalists in baseball
Samsung Lions coaches
Samsung Lions players
South Korean baseball coaches
South Korean baseball players
Baseball players from Seoul
Asian Games gold medalists for South Korea
Medalists at the 2002 Asian Games
South Korean Buddhists